Sir William Richard Michael Oswald,  (21 April 1934 – 17 April 2021) was the National Hunt Racing Adviser to Queen Elizabeth II. He served in the role since 2003. Before that, he was racing manager to Queen Elizabeth The Queen Mother from 1970 to 2002.

The son of Lieutenant-Colonel William Oswald and Rose-Marie Oswald (née Leahy), Michael Oswald was educated at Eton College and King's College, Cambridge. He was commissioned into the Scots Guards, before serving in the Korean War with the 1st Battalion, The King’s Own Royal Regiment.

In the 2020 New Year Honours, Oswald was appointed Knight Grand Cross of the Royal Victorian Order (GCVO). He had previously been appointed KCVO in 1998, CVO in 1988 and LVO in 1979.

He was married to Lady Angela Cecil CVO, the daughter of 6th Marquess of Exeter and former Woman of the Bedchamber to the Queen Mother.

He died on 17 April 2021 at the age of 86.

References

1934 births
2021 deaths
Knights Grand Cross of the Royal Victorian Order
Alumni of King's College, Cambridge
King's Own Royal Regiment officers
Scots Guards officers
British Army personnel of the Korean War
People educated at Eton College